Walter Schönrock (10 April 1912 – 19 March 1996) was a German long-distance runner. He competed in the men's 10,000 metres at the 1936 Summer Olympics.

References

1912 births
1996 deaths
Athletes (track and field) at the 1936 Summer Olympics
German male long-distance runners
Olympic athletes of Germany
Place of birth missing
20th-century German people